is the twenty-second studio album by Japanese heavy metal band Loudness. It was released in 2009 only in Japan, after the death of original drummer Munetaka Higuchi, whose pre-recorded drum tracks were used on this album. It was also 15th and last album recorded by the original line-up. The song "I Wonder" introduces new drummer Masayuki Suzuki. The album also features a quasi-return to their 1980s sound in "Flame of Rock" and "I Wonder".
The cover artwork is inspired by a Thailand's sculpture called "Budda Head in Tree".

Track listing
Music by Akira Takasaki, lyrics by Minoru Niihara

"Hit the Rails" - 4:15
"Flame of Rock" - 4:47
"I Wonder" - 5:08
"The Everlasting" - 5:33
"Life Goes On" - 4:24
"Let It Rock" - 4:06
"Crystal Moon" - 4:44
"Change"- 6:56
"Rock into the Night" - 3:27
"I'm in Pain" - 5:22
"Thunder Burn" - 5:21
"Desperate Religion" - 6:19

Personnel
Loudness
Minoru Niihara - vocals
Akira Takasaki - guitars, vocals on "The Everlasting", producer
Masayoshi Yamashita - bass
Munetaka Higuchi - drums
Masayuki Suzuki - drums on "I Wonder"

Production
Masatoshi Sakimoto - engineer, mixing
Yuki Mitome - assistant engineer
Kazuhiro Yamagata - mastering
Masahiro Shinoki - executive producer

References

2009 albums
Loudness (band) albums
Japanese-language albums
Tokuma Shoten albums